5 (five) is a number, numeral and digit. It is the natural number, and cardinal number, following 4 and preceding 6, and is a prime number. It has garnered attention throughout history in part because distal extremities in humans typically contain five digits.

In mathematics 

 is the third smallest prime number, and the second super-prime. It is the first safe prime, the first good prime, the first balanced prime, and the first of three known Wilson primes. Five is the second Fermat prime and the third Mersenne prime exponent, as well as the third Catalan number, and the third Sophie Germain prime. Notably, 5 is equal to the sum of the only consecutive primes, 2 + 3, and is the only number that is part of more than one pair of twin primes, (3, 5) and (5, 7). It is also part of the first pair of sexy primes, with the fifth prime number and first prime repunit in decimal, 11. Five is the third factorial prime, an alternating factorial, and an Eisenstein prime with no imaginary part and real part of the form  − . In particular, five is the first congruent number, since it is the length of the hypotenuse of the smallest integer-sided right triangle.

Five is the second Fermat prime of the form + , and more generally the second Sierpiński number of the first kind, + . There are a total of five known Fermat primes, which also include 3, 17, 257, and 65537. The sum of the first three Fermat primes, 3, 5 and 17, yields 25 or 52, while 257 is the 55th prime number. Combinations from these five Fermat primes generate 31 polygons with an odd number of sides that can be constructed purely with a compass and straight-edge, which includes the five-sided regular pentagon. Apropos, 31 is also equal to the sum of the maximum number of areas inside a circle that are formed from the sides and diagonals of the first five -sided polygons, and equal to the maximum number of areas formed by a six-sided polygon; per Moser's circle problem.

The number 5 is the fifth Fibonacci number, being 2 plus 3. It is the only Fibonacci number that is equal to its position aside from 1, which is both the first and second Fibonacci numbers. Five is also a Pell number and a Markov number, appearing in solutions to the Markov Diophantine equation: (1, 2, 5), (1, 5, 13), (2, 5, 29), (5, 13, 194), (5, 29, 433), ... ( lists Markov numbers that appear in solutions where one of the other two terms is 5). Whereas 5 is unique in the Fibonacci sequence, in the Perrin sequence 5 is both the fifth and sixth Perrin numbers.

5 is the third Mersenne prime exponent of the form  − , which yields : the prime index of the third Mersenne prime and second double Mersenne prime 127, as well as the third double Mersenne prime exponent for the number 2,147,483,647, which is the largest value that a signed 32-bit integer field can hold. There are only four known double Mersenne prime numbers, with a fifth candidate double Mersenne prime  =  223058...93951 − 1 too large to compute with current computers. In a related sequence, the first 5 terms in the sequence of Catalan–Mersenne numbers  are the only known prime terms, with a sixth possible candidate in the order of 101037.7094. These prime sequences are conjectured to be prime up to a certain limit.

Helfgott has provided a proof of the latter, also known as the odd Goldbach conjecture, that is already widely acknowledged by mathematicians as it still undergoes peer-review.

There are a total of five known unitary perfect numbers, which are numbers that are the sums of their positive proper unitary divisors. The smallest such number is 6, and the largest of these is equivalent to the sum of 4095 divisors, where 4095 is the largest of five Ramanujan–Nagell numbers that are both triangular numbers and Mersenne numbers of the general form. Within the larger family of Ore numbers, 140 and 496, respectively the fourth and sixth indexed members, both contain a set of divisors that produce integer harmonic means equal to 5.
 
Five is conjectured to be the only odd untouchable number, and if this is the case then five will be the only odd prime number that is not the base of an aliquot tree. 

In figurate numbers, 5 is a pentagonal number, with the sequence of pentagonal numbers starting: 1, 5, 12, 22, 35, ...
 5 is a centered tetrahedral number: 1, 5, 15, 35, 69, ... Every centered tetrahedral number with an index of 2, 3 or 4 modulo 5 is divisible by 5.
 5 is a square pyramidal number: 1, 5, 14, 30, 55, ... The first four members add to 50 while the fifth indexed member in the sequence is 55.
 5 is a centered square number: 1, 5, 13, 25, 41, ... The fifth square number or 52 is 25, which features in the proportions of the two smallest (3, 4, 5) and (5, 12, 13) primitive Pythagorean triples.

The factorial of five, or ! = , is also the sum of the first fifteen non-zero positive integers, and 15th triangular number, which in-turn is the sum of the first five non-zero positive integers and 5th triangular number. 35, which is the fourth or fifth pentagonal and tetrahedral number, is equal to the sum of the first five triangular numbers: 1, 3, 6, 10, 15.

5 is the value of the central cell of the only non-trivial normal magic square, also called the Lo Shu square.

Polynomial equations of degree  and below can be solved with radicals, while quintic equations of degree 5, and higher, cannot generally be so solved. This is the Abel–Ruffini theorem. This is related to the fact that the symmetric group  is a solvable group for  ⩽ , and not for  ⩾ .

In the Collatz problem, 5 requires five steps to reach 1 by multiplying terms by three and adding one if the term is odd (starting with five itself), and dividing by two if they are even: {5 ➙ 16 ➙ 8 ➙ 4 ➙ 2 ➙ 1}; the only other number to require five steps is 32 (since 16 must be part of such path). When generalizing the Collatz conjecture to all positive or negative integers, −5 becomes one of only four known possible cycle starting points and endpoints, and in its case in five steps too: {−5 ➙ −14 ➙ −7 ➙ −20 ➙ −10 ➙ −5 ➙ ...}. The other possible cycles begin and end at −17 in eighteen steps, −1 in two steps, and 1 in three steps. In the analogous  problem, 5 requires five steps to return cyclically to 5, in this instance by multiplying terms by three and subtracting 1 if the terms are odd, and also halving if even: {5 ➙ 14 ➙ 7 ➙ 20 ➙ 10 ➙ 5 ➙ ...}. This is also the first number to generate a cycle that is not trivial (i.e. 1 ➙ 2 ➙ 1 ➙ ...) while also generating a {14 ➙ ... ➙ 14} cycle that appears in other trajectories (alongside those generated by the other numbers in the path cycle of 5).

In general, the Fraïssé limit of a class  of finite relational structure is the age of a countable homogeneous relational structure  iff five conditions hold for : it is closed under isomorphism, it has only countably many isomorphism classes, it is hereditary, it is joint-embedded, and it holds the amalgamation property.

Euler's identity, +  = , contains five essential numbers used widely in mathematics: Archimedes' constant , Euler's number , the imaginary number , unity , and zero , which makes this formula a renown example of beauty in mathematics.

In geometry 

A pentagram, or five-pointed polygram, is the first proper star polygon constructed from the diagonals of a regular pentagon as self-intersecting edges that are proportioned in golden ratio, . Its internal geometry appears prominently in Penrose tilings, and is a facet inside Kepler-Poinsot star polyhedra and Schläfli–Hess star polychora, represented by its Schläfli symbol }. A similar figure to the pentagram is a five-pointed simple isotoxal star ☆ without self-intersecting edges. It is often found as a facet inside Islamic Girih tiles, of which there are five different rudimentary types. Generally, star polytopes that are regular only exist in dimensions  ⩽  < , and can be constructed using five Miller rules for stellating polyhedra or higher-dimensional polytopes.

In graph theory, all graphs with 4 or fewer vertices are planar, however, there is a graph with 5 vertices that is not: K5, the complete graph with 5 vertices, where every pair of distinct vertices in a pentagon is joined by unique edges belonging to a pentagram. By Kuratowski's theorem, a finite graph is planar iff it does not contain a subgraph that is a subdivision of K5, or the complete bipartite utility graph K3,3. A similar graph is the Petersen graph, which is strongly connected and also nonplanar. It is most easily described as graph of a pentagram embedded inside a pentagon, with a total of 5 crossings, a girth of 5, and a Thue number of 5. The Petersen graph, which is also a distance-regular graph, is one of only 5 known connected vertex-transitive graphs with no Hamiltonian cycles. The automorphism group of the Petersen graph is the symmetric group  of order 120 = 5!.

The chromatic number of the plane is at least five, depending on the choice of set-theoretical axioms: the minimum number of colors required to color the plane such that no pair of points at a distance of 1 has the same color. Whereas the hexagonal Golomb graph and the regular hexagonal tiling generate chromatic numbers of 4 and 7, respectively, a chromatic coloring of 5 can be attained under a more complicated graph where multiple four-coloring Moser spindles are linked so that no monochromatic triples exist in any coloring of the overall graph, as that would generate an equilateral arrangement that tends toward a purely hexagonal structure.

The plane contains a total of five Bravais lattices, or arrays of points defined by discrete translation operations: hexagonal, oblique, rectangular, centered rectangular, and square lattices. Uniform tilings of the plane are generated from combinations of only five regular polygons: the triangle, square, hexagon, octagon, and the dodecagon. The plane can also be tiled monohedrally with convex pentagons in fifteen different ways, three of which have Laves tilings as special cases.

Five points are needed to determine a conic section, in the same way that two points are needed to determine a line. A Veronese surface in the projective plane  of a conic generalizes a linear condition for a point to be contained inside a conic.

There are five Platonic solids in three-dimensional space: the tetrahedron, cube, octahedron, dodecahedron, and icosahedron. The dodecahedron in particular contains pentagonal faces, while the icosahedron, its dual polyhedron, has a vertex figure that is a regular pentagon. There are also five:

 Regular polyhedron compounds: the stella octangula, compound of five tetrahedra, compound of five cubes, compound of five octahedra, and compound of ten tetrahedra. Icosahedral symmetry  is isomorphic to the alternating group on 5 letters  of order 120, realized by actions on these uniform polyhedron compounds.

 Space-filling convex polyhedra with regular faces: the triangular prism, hexagonal prism, cube, truncated octahedron, and gyrobifastigium. The cube is the only Platonic solid that can tessellate space on its own, and the truncated octahedron and gyrobifastigium are the only Archimedean and Johnson solids, respectively, that can tessellate space with their own copies.

 Cell-transitive parallelohedra: any parallelepiped, as well as the rhombic dodecahedron, the elongated dodecahedron, the hexagonal prism and the truncated octahedron. The cube is a special case of a parallelepiped, and the rhombic dodecahedron (with five stellations per Miller's rules) is the only Catalan solid to tessellate space on its own.

 Regular abstract polyhedra, which include the excavated dodecahedron and the dodecadodecahedron. They have combinatorial symmetries transitive on flags of their elements, with topologies equivalent to that of toroids and the ability to tile the hyperbolic plane.

 Semiregular prisms that are facets inside non-prismatic uniform four-dimensional figures: the triangular, pentagonal, hexagonal, octagonal, and decagonal prisms. There are also five uniform prisms and antiprisms that contain pentagons or pentagrams: the pentagonal prism and antiprism, and the pentagrammic prism, antiprism, and crossed-antirprism.

The pentatope, or 5-cell, is the self-dual fourth-dimensional analogue of the tetrahedron, with Coxeter group symmetry  of order 120 = 5! and  group structure. Made of five tetrahedra, its Petrie polygon is a regular pentagon and its orthographic projection is equivalent to the complete graph K5. It is one of six regular 4-polytopes, made of thirty-one elements: five vertices, ten edges, ten faces, five tetrahedral cells and one 4-face.

A regular 120-cell, the dual polychoron to the regular 600-cell, can fit one hundred and twenty 5-cells. Also, five 24-cells fit inside a small stellated 120-cell, the first stellation of the 120-cell.

A subset of the vertices of the small stellated 120-cell are matched by the great duoantiprism star, which is the only uniform nonconvex duoantiprismatic solution in the fourth dimension, constructed from the polytope cartesian product  and made of fifty tetrahedra, ten pentagrammic crossed antiprisms, ten pentagonal antiprisms, and fifty vertices.

The grand antiprism, which is the only known non-Wythoffian construction of a uniform polychoron, is made of twenty pentagonal antiprisms and three hundred tetrahedra, with a total of one hundred vertices and five hundred edges.

The abstract four-dimensional 57-cell is made of fifty-seven hemi-icosahedral cells, in-which five surround each edge. The 11-cell, another abstract 4-polytope with eleven vertices and fifty-five edges, is made of eleven hemi-dodecahedral cells each with fifteen dodecahedra. The skeleton of the hemi-dodecahedron is the Petersen graph.

All of these uniform 4-polytopes are generated from 25 uniform polyhedra, which include the five Platonic solids, fifteen Archimedean solids counting two enantiomorphic forms, and five prisms. There are also a total of five Coxeter groups that generate non-prismatic Euclidean honeycombs in 4-space, alongside five compact hyperbolic Coxeter groups that generate five regular compact hyperbolic honeycombs with finite facets, as with the order-5 5-cell honeycomb and the order-5 120-cell honeycomb, both of which have five cells around each face. Compact hyperbolic honeycombs only exist through the fourth dimension, or rank 5, with paracompact hyperbolic solutions existing through rank 10. Likewise, analogues of four-dimensional  hexadecachoric or  icositetrachoric symmetry do not exist in dimensions  ⩾ ; however, there are prismatic groups in the fifth dimension which contains prisms of regular and uniform 4-polytopes that have  and  symmetry. There are also five regular projective 4-polytopes in the fourth dimension, all of which are hemi-polytopes of the regular 4-polytopes, with the exception of the 5-cell. Only two regular projective polytopes exist in each higher dimensional space.

The 5-simplex or hexateron is the five-dimensional analogue of the 5-cell,  or 4-simplex. It has Coxeter group  as its symmetry group, of order 720 = 6!, whose group structure is represented by the symmetric group , the only finite symmetric group which has an outer automorphism. The 5-cube, made of ten tesseracts and the 5-cell as its vertex figure, is also regular and one of thirty-one uniform 5-polytopes under the Coxeter  hypercubic group. The demipenteract, with one hundred and twenty cells, is the only fifth-dimensional semiregular polytope, and has the rectified 5-cell as its vertex figure, which is one of only three semiregular 4-polytopes alongside the rectified 600-cell and the snub 24-cell. In the fifth dimension, there are five regular paracompact honeycombs, all with infinite facets and vertex figures; no other regular paracompact honeycombs exist in higher dimensions.

The smallest of these, can be represented in five-dimensional complex space and projected as a ball rolling on top of another ball, whose motion is described in two-dimensional space.  is the largest of all five exceptional groups, with the other four as subgroups, and an associated lattice that is constructed with one hundred and twenty quaternionic unit icosians that make up the vertices of the 600-cell, whose Euclidean norms define a quadratic form on a lattice structure isomorphic to the optimal configuration of spheres in eight dimensions. This sphere packing  lattice structure in 8-space is held by the vertex arrangement of the 521 honeycomb, one of five Euclidean honeycombs that admit Gosset's original definition of a semiregular honeycomb, which includes the three-dimensional alternated cubic honeycomb. There are specifically five solvable groups that are excluded from finite simple groups of Lie type.

The five Mathieu groups constitute the first generation in the happy family of sporadic groups. These are also the first five sporadic groups to have been described, defined as  multiply transitive permutation groups on  objects, with  ∈ {11, 12, 22, 23, 24}. In particular, the smallest of all sporadic groups, has a rank 3 action on fifty-five points from an induced action on unordered pairs, as well as two five-dimensional faithful complex irreducible representations over the field with three elements, which is the lowest irreducible dimensional representation of all sporadic group over their respective fields with  elements. The Witt design and the extended binary Golay code in turn can be used to generate a faithful construction of the 24-dimensional Leech lattice Λ24, which is the subject of the second generation of seven sporadic groups that are subquotients of the automorphism of the Leech lattice, Conway group .

There are five non-supersingular primes: 37, 43, 53, 61, and 67, all smaller than the largest of fifteen supersingular prime divisors of the friendly giant, 71.

List of basic calculations

In decimal 

5 is the only prime number to end in the digit 5 in decimal because all other numbers written with a 5 in the ones place are multiples of five, which makes it a 1-automorphic number.

In the powers of 5, every power ends with the number five, and from 53 onward, if the exponent is odd, then the hundreds digit is 1, and if it is even, the hundreds digit is 6.

Evolution of the Arabic digit 

The evolution of the modern Western digit for the numeral 5 cannot be traced back to the Indian system, as for the digits 1 to 4. The Kushana and Gupta empires in what is now India had among themselves several different forms that bear no resemblance to the modern digit. The Nagari and Punjabi took these digits and all came up with forms that were similar to a lowercase "h" rotated 180°. The Ghubar Arabs transformed the digit in several different ways, producing from that were more similar to the digits 4 or 3 than to 5. It was from those digits that Europeans finally came up with the modern 5.

On the seven-segment display of a calculator, it is represented by five segments at four successive turns from top to bottom, rotating counterclockwise first, then clockwise, and vice-versa.

Science  
The atomic number of boron.
The number of appendages on most starfish, which exhibit pentamerism.
The most destructive known hurricanes rate as Category 5 on the Saffir–Simpson hurricane wind scale.
The most destructive known tornadoes rate an F-5 on the Fujita scale or EF-5 on the Enhanced Fujita scale.

Astronomy 
There are five Lagrangian points in a two-body system.
There are currently five dwarf planets in the Solar System: Ceres, Pluto, Haumea, Makemake, and Eris.
The Roman numeral V stands for dwarfs (main sequence stars) in the Yerkes spectral classification scheme. 
The Roman numeral V (usually) stands for the fifth-discovered satellite of a planet or minor planet (e.g. Jupiter V).
The New General Catalogue object NGC 5, a magnitude 13 spiral galaxy in the constellation Andromeda.
Messier object M5, a magnitude 7.0 globular cluster in the constellation Serpens.

Biology 

There are usually considered to be five senses (in general terms).
The five basic tastes are sweet, salty, sour, bitter, and umami.
Almost all amphibians, reptiles, and mammals which have fingers or toes have five of them on each extremity.

Computing 
5 is the ASCII code of the Enquiry character, which is abbreviated to ENQ.

Religion and culture

Hinduism 
The god Shiva has five faces and his mantra is also called  (five-worded) mantra.
There are five elements in the universe according to Hindu cosmology:  (earth, fire, water, air and space respectively).
The most sacred tree in Hinduism has 5 leaves in every leaf stunt.
Most of the flowers have 5 petals in them.
The epic Mahabharata revolves around the battle between Duryodhana and his 99 other brothers and the 5 pandava princes—Dharma, Arjuna, Bhima, Nakula and Sahadeva.

Christianity 
There are traditionally five wounds of Jesus Christ in Christianity: the Scourging at the Pillar, the Crowning with Thorns, the wounds in Christ's hands, the wounds in Christ's feet, and the Side Wound of Christ.

Gnosticism 
The number five was an important symbolic number in Manichaeism, with heavenly beings, concepts, and others often grouped in sets of five.
Five Seals in Sethianism
Five Trees in the Gospel of Thomas

Islam 
The Five Pillars of Islam
Muslims pray to Allah five times a day
According to Shia Muslims, the Panjetan or the Five Holy Purified Ones are the members of Muhammad's family: Muhammad, Ali, Fatimah, Hasan, and Husayn and are often symbolically represented by an image of the Khamsa.

Judaism 
The Torah contains five books—Genesis, Exodus, Leviticus, Numbers, and Deuteronomy—which are collectively called the Five Books of Moses, the Pentateuch (Greek for "five containers", referring to the scroll cases in which the books were kept), or Humash (Hebrew for "fifth").
The book of Psalms is arranged into five books, paralleling the Five Books of Moses.
The Khamsa, an ancient symbol shaped like a hand with four fingers and one thumb, is used as a protective amulet by Jews; that same symbol is also very popular in Arabic culture, known to protect from envy and the evil eye.

Sikhism 

Daoism 
5 Elements
5 Emperors

Other religions and cultures 
According to ancient Greek philosophers such as Aristotle, the universe is made up of five classical elements: water, earth, air, fire, and ether. This concept was later adopted by medieval alchemists and more recently by practitioners of Neo-Pagan religions such as Wicca.
The pentagram, or five-pointed star, bears religious significance in various faiths including Baháʼí, Christianity, Freemasonry, Satanism, Taoism, Thelema, and Wicca.
In Cantonese, "five" sounds like the word "not". When five appears in front of a lucky number, e.g. "58", the result is considered unlucky.
In East Asian tradition, there are five elements: (water, fire, earth, wood, and metal). The Japanese names for the days of the week, Tuesday through Saturday, come from these elements via the identification of the elements with the five planets visible with the naked eye. Also, the traditional Japanese calendar has a five-day weekly cycle that can be still observed in printed mixed calendars combining Western, Chinese-Buddhist, and Japanese names for each weekday.
In numerology, 5 or a series of 555, is often associated with change, evolution, love and abundance.
Members of The Nation of Gods and Earths, a primarily African American religious organization, call themselves the "Five-Percenters" because they believe that only 5% of mankind is truly enlightened.

Art, entertainment, and media

Fictional entities 
James the Red Engine, a fictional character numbered 5.
Johnny 5 is the lead character in the film Short Circuit (1986)
Number Five is a character in Lorien Legacies
 Numbuh 5, real name Abigail Lincoln, from Codename: Kids Next Door
Sankara Stones, five magical rocks in Indiana Jones and the Temple of Doom that are sought by the Thuggees for evil purposes
The Mach Five , the racing car Speed Racer ( in the Japanese version) drives in the anime series of the same name (known as "Mach Go! Go! Go!" in Japan)
In the works of J. R. R. Tolkien, five wizards (Saruman, Gandalf, Radagast, Alatar and Pallando) are sent to Middle-earth to aid against the threat of the Dark Lord Sauron
In the A Song of Ice and Fire series, the War of the Five Kings is fought between different claimants to the Iron Throne of Westeros, as well as to the thrones of the individual regions of Westeros (Joffrey Baratheon, Stannis Baratheon, Renly Baratheon, Robb Stark and Balon Greyjoy)
In The Wheel of Time series, the "Emond's Field Five" are a group of five of the series' main characters who all come from the village of Emond's Field (Rand al'Thor, Matrim Cauthon, Perrin Aybara, Egwene al'Vere and Nynaeve al'Meara)
Myst uses the number 5 as a unique base counting system.  In The Myst Reader series, it is further explained that the number 5 is considered a holy number in the fictional D'ni society.
Number Five is also a character in The Umbrella Academy comic book and TV series adaptation

Films 
Towards the end of the film Monty Python and the Holy Grail (1975), the character of King Arthur repeatedly confuses the number five with the number three.
Five Go Mad in Dorset (1982) was the first of the long-running series of The Comic Strip Presents... television comedy films
The Fifth Element (1997), a science fiction film
 Fast Five (2011), the fifth installment of the Fast and Furious film series.
V for Vendetta (2005), produced by Warner Bros., directed by James McTeigue, and adapted from Alan Moore's graphic novel V for Vendetta prominently features number 5 and Roman Numeral V; the story is based on the historical event in which a group of men attempted to destroy Parliament on November 5, 1605

Music 
Modern musical notation uses a musical staff made of five horizontal lines.
A scale with five notes per octave is called a pentatonic scale.
A perfect fifth is the most consonant harmony, and is the basis for most western tuning systems.
In harmonics, the fifth partial (or 4th overtone) of a fundamental has a frequency ratio of 5:1 to the frequency of that fundamental. This ratio corresponds to the interval of 2 octaves plus a pure major third. Thus, the interval of 5:4 is the interval of the pure third. A major triad chord when played in just intonation (most often the case in a cappella vocal ensemble singing), will contain such a pure major third.
Using the Latin root, five musicians are called a quintet.
Five is the lowest possible number that can be the top number of a time signature with an asymmetric meter.

Groups 
Five (group), a UK Boy band
The Five (composers), 19th-century Russian composers
5 Seconds of Summer, pop band that originated in Sydney, Australia
Five Americans, American rock band active 1965–1969
Five Finger Death Punch, American heavy metal band from Las Vegas, Nevada. Active 2005–present
Five Man Electrical Band, Canadian rock group billed (and active) as the Five Man Electrical Band, 1969–1975
Maroon 5, American pop rock band that originated in Los Angeles, California
MC5, American punk rock band
Pentatonix, a Grammy-winning a cappella group originated in Arlington, Texas
The 5th Dimension, American pop vocal group, active 1977–present
The Dave Clark Five, a.k.a. DC5, an English pop rock group comprising Dave Clark, Lenny Davidson, Rick Huxley, Denis Payton, and Mike Smith; active 1958–1970
The Jackson 5, American pop rock group featuring various members of the Jackson family; they were billed (and active) as The Jackson 5, 1966–1975
Hi-5, Australian pop kids group, where it has several international adaptations, and several members throughout the history of the band. It was also a TV show.
We Five: American folk rock group active 1965–1967 and 1968–1977
Grandmaster Flash and the Furious Five: American rap group, 1970–80's
Fifth Harmony, an American girl group.
Ben Folds Five, an American alternative rock trio, 1993–2000, 2008 and 2011–2013
R5 (band), an American pop and alternative rock group, 2009–2018

Other 
The number of completed, numbered piano concertos of Ludwig van Beethoven, Sergei Prokofiev, and Camille Saint-Saëns.

Television 
Stations
Channel 5 (UK), a television channel that broadcasts in the United Kingdom
5 (TV channel) (formerly known as ABC 5 and TV5) (DWET-TV channel 5 In Metro Manila) a television network in the Philippines.

Series
Babylon 5, a science fiction television series
The number 5 features in the television series Battlestar Galactica in regards to the Final Five cylons and the Temple of Five
Hi-5 (Australian TV series), a television series from Australia
Hi-5 (UK TV series), a television show from the United Kingdom
Hi-5 Philippines a television show from the Philippines
Odyssey 5, a 2002 science fiction television series
Tillbaka till Vintergatan, a Swedish children's television series featuring a character named "Femman" (meaning five), who can only utter the word 'five'.
The Five (talk show): Fox News Channel roundtable current events television show, premiered 2011, so-named for its panel of five commentators.
Yes! PreCure 5 is a 2007 anime series which follows the adventures of Nozomi and her friends. It is also followed by the 2008 sequel Yes! Pretty Cure 5 GoGo!
The Quintessential Quintuplets is a 2019 slice of life romance anime series which follows the everyday life of five identical quintuplets and their interactions with their tutor. It has two seasons, and a final movie is scheduled in summer 2022.
Hawaii Five-0, CBS American TV series.

Literature 
The Famous Five is a series of children's books by British writer Enid Blyton
The Power of Five is a series of children's books by British writer and screenwriter Anthony Horowitz
The Fall of Five is a book written under the collective pseudonym Pittacus Lore in the series Lorien Legacies
The Book of Five Rings is a text on kenjutsu and the martial arts in general, written by the swordsman Miyamoto Musashi circa 1645
Slaughterhouse-Five is a book by Kurt Vonnegut about World War II

Sports 
The Olympic Games have five interlocked rings as their symbol, representing the number of inhabited continents represented by the Olympians (Europe, Asia, Africa, Australia and Oceania, and the Americas).
 In AFL Women's, the top level of women's Australian rules football, each team is allowed 5 "interchanges" (substitute players), who can be freely substituted at any time.
In baseball scorekeeping, the number 5 represents the third baseman's position.
In basketball:
The number 5 is used to represent the position of center.
Each team has five players on the court at a given time. Thus, the phrase "five on five" is commonly used to describe standard competitive basketball.
The "5-second rule" refers to several related rules designed to promote continuous play. In all cases, violation of the rule results in a turnover.
Under the FIBA (used for all international play, and most non-US leagues) and NCAA women's rule sets, a team begins shooting bonus free throws once its opponent has committed five personal fouls in a quarter.
Under the FIBA rules, A player fouls out and must leave the game after committing five fouls
Five-a-side football is a variation of association football in which each team fields five players.
In ice hockey:
 A major penalty lasts five minutes.
 There are five different ways that a player can score a goal (teams at even strength, team on the power play, team playing shorthanded, penalty shot, and empty net).
 The area between the goaltender's legs is known as the five-hole.
In most rugby league competitions, the starting left wing wears this number. An exception is the Super League, which uses static squad numbering.
In rugby union:
 A try is worth 5 points.
 One of the two starting lock forwards wears number 5, and usually jumps at number 4 in the line-out.
 In the French variation of the bonus points system, a bonus point in the league standings is awarded to a team that loses by 5 or fewer points.

Technology 

5 is the most common number of gears for automobiles with manual transmission.
In radio communication, the term "Five by five" is used to indicate perfect signal strength and clarity.
On almost all devices with a numeric keypad such as telephones, computers, etc., the 5 key has a raised dot or raised bar to make dialing easier. Persons who are blind or have low vision find it useful to be able to feel the keys of a telephone. All other numbers can be found with their relative position around the 5 button (on computer keyboards, the 5 key of the numpad has the raised dot or bar, but the 5 key that shifts with % does not).
On most telephones, the 5 key is associated with the letters J, K, and L, but on some of the BlackBerry phones, it is the key for G and H.
The Pentium, coined by Intel Corporation, is a fifth-generation x86 architecture microprocessor.
The resin identification code used in recycling to identify polypropylene.

Miscellaneous fields 

Five can refer to:
"Give me five" is a common phrase used preceding a high five.
An informal term for the British Security Service, MI5.
Five babies born at one time are quintuplets. The most famous set of quintuplets were the Dionne quintuplets born in the 1930s.
In the United States legal system, the Fifth Amendment to the United States Constitution can be referred to in court as "pleading the fifth", absolving the defendant from self-incrimination.
Pentameter is verse with five repeating feet per line; iambic pentameter was the most popular form in Shakespeare.
Quintessence, meaning "fifth element", refers to the elusive fifth element that completes the basic four elements (water, fire, air, and earth)
The designation of an Interstate Highway (Interstate 5) that runs from San Diego, California to Blaine, Washington. In addition, all major north-south Interstate Highways in the United States end in 5.
In the computer game Riven, 5 is considered a holy number, and is a recurring theme throughout the game, appearing in hundreds of places, from the number of islands in the game to the number of bolts on pieces of machinery.
The Garden of Cyrus (1658) by Sir Thomas Browne is a Pythagorean discourse based upon the number 5.
The holy number of Discordianism, as dictated by the Law of Fives.
The number of Justices on the Supreme Court of the United States necessary to render a majority decision.
The number of dots in a quincunx.
The number of permanent members with veto power on the United Nations Security Council.
The number of sides and the number of angles in a pentagon.
The number of points in a pentagram.
The number of Korotkoff sounds when measuring blood pressure
The drink Five Alive is named for its five ingredients. The drink punch derives its name after the Sanskrit पञ्च (pañc) for having five ingredients.
The Keating Five were five United States Senators accused of corruption in 1989.
The Inferior Five: Merryman, Awkwardman, The Blimp, White Feather, and Dumb Bunny. DC Comics parody superhero team.
No. 5 is the name of the iconic fragrance created by Coco Chanel.
The Committee of Five was delegated to draft the United States Declaration of Independence.
The five-second rule is a commonly used rule of thumb for dropped food.
555 95472, usually referred to simply as 5, is a minor male character in the comic strip Peanuts.

See also 

Five Families
Five Nations (disambiguation)
555 (number)
List of highways numbered 5

References 

Wells, D. The Penguin Dictionary of Curious and Interesting Numbers London: Penguin Group. (1987): 58–67

External links 

The Number 5
The Positive Integer 5
Prime curiosities: 5

Integers
5 (number)